Lloyd Bourne and Jeff Klaparda were the defending champions, but did not participate this year.

Andrew Castle and Tim Wilkison won the title, defeating Jeremy Bates and Michael Mortensen 4–6, 7–5, 7–6 in the final.

Seeds

  Jeremy Bates /  Michael Mortensen (final)
  Eric Jelen /  Patrik Kühnen (quarterfinals)
  Andrew Castle /  Tim Wilkison (champions)
  Matt Anger /  Michiel Schapers (semifinals)

Draw

Draw

References
Draw

Doubles